Amraudha is a town and a nagar panchayat in Kanpur Dehat district  in the state of Uttar Pradesh, India.
It is a Development block in Bhognipur tehsil.

Location
It is located at 9 kilometer from city Pukhrayan toward south -west near Kanpur-Jhansi road.

Demographics
 India census, Amraudha had a population of 8890. Males constitute 54% of the population and females 46%. Amraudha has an average literacy rate of 48%, lower than the national average of 59.5%; with 61% of the males and 39% of females literate. 19% of the population is under 6 years of age.

References

Cities and towns in Kanpur Dehat district